Ave Fénix (English title:Rising Phoenix) is a Mexican telenovela produced by Guillermo Diazayas and Enrique Segoviano for Televisa in 1986.

Laura Flores, Rafael Baledón and Martín Cortés starred as protagonists, while Ernesto Yáñez starred as main antagonist. Juan Antonio Edwards, Edgardo Gazcón and Roberto Montiel starred as stellar performances.

Plot
Mauro is an old businessman owner of a major international company, Astro. He lives in a luxurious home in Las Lomas with his three nephews: Paulina, Roberto and Enrique. Mauro learns that his company is in bankruptcy and not to harm his nephews, leaves and becomes a beggar. It is to live in a neighborhood where he meets Julia and Daniel, two children who are children of Rogelio a recent widower who is dedicated to steal company offender El Gordo.

Mauro takes them affection for both children, and in the course of history, rebuild his fortune. Meanwhile, Paulina seeing in poverty has been married to Arthur, a young man dominated by his mother, who does not love. But after many misfortunes will find love in Gerardo.

Cast 
Laura Flores as Paulina
Rafael Baledón as Mauro
Martín Cortés as Gerardo
Edgardo Gazcón as Roberto
Juan Antonio Edwards as Arturo
Roberto Montiel as Enrique
July Furlong as Cristina
Carlos Ignacio as Rogelio
Paty Thomas as Elsa
Luis Mario Quiroz as Daniel
Ayerim de la Peña as Julia
Porfirio Bas as Pedro
Raúl Meraz as Mr. Jackson
Irlanda Mora as Leticia
Lilia Michel as Deborah
Carlos Poulliot as Hans
Carmen Delgado as Irma
Alberto Inzúa as Pablo
Ernesto Yáñez as El Gordo
José Zambrano as Adrián
Claudia Inchaurregui as Betty
Manolita Saval as Celia
Marta Zamora
Rosita Bouchot

References

External links

Mexican telenovelas
1986 telenovelas
1986 Mexican television series debuts
1986 Mexican television series endings
Spanish-language telenovelas
Television shows set in Mexico City
Televisa telenovelas